Takatori Station is a HRT station on Astram Line, located in 1-4-28, Takatori-kita, Asaminami-ku, Hiroshima.

Platforms

Connections
█ Astram Line
●Kamiyasu — ●Takatori — ●Chōrakuji

Around station

History
Opened on August 20, 1994

References 

Takatori Station
Railway stations in Japan opened in 1994